The Eastern Illinois Panthers track and field program represents Eastern Illinois University in the sport of track and field. The program includes separate men's and women's teams, both of which compete in Division I of the National Collegiate Athletic Association (NCAA) and the Ohio Valley Conference (OVC).  The Panthers host their home indoor meets in the Lantz Field House and their home outdoor meets at O'Brien Field, both located on the university's campus.  The Panthers track teams are currently led by head coach Keith Roberts.

History 
The Eastern Illinois men's track and field team was organized in 1912 and got its first official coach in 1933 in Winfield Angus. Before 1933, coaching duties were assumed by a male faculty member; the Panthers women's team was formed in 1974–75.  Eastern Illinois joined the Ohio Valley Conference (OVC) in 1996, and the Panthers track team began to compete in the OVC in the winter of 1996.

Historically, the Panthers have been a force in the OVC, and have won a total of 51 conference team championships since 1996-97. The Panthers men have won seventeen OVC outdoor championships (1997, 1998, 1999, 2000, 2001, 2002, 2003, 2004, 2007, 2009, 2010, 2011, 2012, 2013, 2015, 2019, 2021), and nineteen indoor championships (1997, 1998, 1999, 2001, 2002, 2003, 2004, 2005, 2006, 2007, 2009, 2010, 2011, 2012, 2013, 2016, 2017, 2020, 2023). The Panthers women have won eight OVC outdoor championships (2007, 2009, 2010, 2011, 2012, 2013, 2016, 2017), and seven indoor championships (2007, 2009, 2010, 2011, 2012, 2015, 2017).

NCAA individual event champions
Individual Champions:
1955: Ray White, NAIA Long Jump
1967: John Craft, NAIA Triple Jump
1969: John Craft, NCAA College Division Triple Jump
1972: Rodney Jackson, NCAA College Division 400 hurdles
1973: Rodney Jackson, NCAA College Division 400 hurdles
1974: Darrell Brown, NCAA Division II Long Jump
1975: Toni Ababio, NCAA Division II Long Jump
1975: Toni Ababio, NCAA Division II Triple Jump
1976: Ed Hatch, NCAA Division II 400 Meter Dash
1979: Robert Johnson, NCAA Division II 110 hurdles
1981: Augustine Oruwari, NCAA Division II 110 hurdles
1988: Jim Maton, NCAA Division I 800 meter run (Indoor)
1992: Dan Steele, NCAA Division I 400 hurdles
Group Champions:
1981: 4x400 Relay, Women’s Track & Field AIAW II

Eastern Illinois Olympic medalists

 Dan Steele, Bronze Medalist at the 2002 Winter Olympics

Retired Jersey

Notable former athletes

Track
 John Craft, placed 5th in the Men’s triple jump at the 1972 Summer Olympics
 Sandy Osei-Agyemang, advanced to the second round in the Men's 100 metres and Men's 4 × 100 metres relay at the 1972 Summer Olympics
 Dan Steele, track All-American, 400-meter National Champion, and Bronze Medalist at the 2002 Winter Olympics
 Darrin Steele, competed at the 1998 Winter Olympics and the 2002 Winter Olympics

References